The Aeromarine B-45 is an aircraft engine built by the Aeromarine Plane and Motor Company in 1915. The B-45 shares the same bore, stroke and valve configuration as the B-90, except in a 45° Vee configuration. The other primary difference are cast aluminum cylinders in place of the B-90's cast iron resulting in a  weight savings.

Specifications

References 

1910s aircraft piston engines